The Leaning Tower of Britten is a leaning water tower which serves as a roadside attraction and decorative item along historic U.S. Route 66 in Groom, Texas. Sometimes called the Leaning Tower of Texas, the tower was originally a functioning water tower which was slated for demolition until Ralph Britten purchased and moved it to serve as an advertisement for his truck stop and tourist information center. The Leaning Tower Truck Stop closed in the mid 1980s after  it was damaged by an electrical fire; a small remaining portion operates as a local truck repair shop.

Deliberately leaning at a roughly 10 degree angle, the tower is a popular tourist destination. There is a small gravel road on the site for parking and taking pictures. During the Christmas season, the city of Groom places a large multicolored star on top of the tower. Images of the water tower are common in Route 66 photography books.

References

Buildings and structures in Carson County, Texas
Inclined towers in the United States
Roadside attractions in Texas
U.S. Route 66 in Texas
Water towers in the United States